Vivian Forbes (8 August 1891 – 24 December 1937) was an English soldier, painter and poet in the early 20th century, and the longtime partner of painter Glyn Philpot.

Forbes was enlisted in the Royal Fusiliers and met Philpot at a training in Aldershot in 1915. He was involved in business in Egypt after the war, and before beginning a more serious relationship with Philpot. Like Philpot, Forbes' work was affected by concern over the rise of fascism in Europe, and he was influenced by the 19th century Aestheticism movement, and painters like Charles Ricketts and Charles Haslewood Shannon. Forbes also composed poetry, all of it dedicated to Philpot and their relationship. Forbes, Philpot, Ricketts and Shannon all had studios at some point in the Lansdown Road building of the Ladbroke Estate.

Described as witty and charming, Forbes was also unstable, and his relationship with Philpot was very close. Following Philpot's sudden death on 18 December 1937, Forbes was overcome with grief, and committed suicide using sleeping pills on 23 December after Philpot's funeral.

References

 

1891 births
1937 suicides
20th-century English painters
English male painters
English LGBT painters
Painters who committed suicide
Drug-related suicides in England
20th-century English LGBT people
20th-century English male artists